Arish (also Romanized as Ārīsh; also known as Ārishk, Harīsh, and Horīsh) is a village in Khusf Rural District, Central District, Khusf County, South Khorasan Province, Iran. At the 2006 census, its population was 12, in 5 families.

References 

Populated places in Khusf County